Ferenc Tóth may refer to:
 Ferenc Tóth (wrestler) (1909–1981), Hungarian wrestler
 Ferenc Tóth (politician) (1950–2020), Hungarian engineer and politician
 Ferenc Tóth (pilot), Hungarian glider aerobatic pilot